The Great American Beer Festival (GABF) is an annual beer festival hosted by the Brewers Association, held in Denver, Colorado. Typically held in late September or early October, the event is currently held at Denver's Colorado Convention Center. Established in 1982, it is the largest ticketed beer festival in the U.S. and one of the largest in the world.

History 
The GABF was founded by brewer Charlie Papazian, and the first festival was held in conjunction with the American Homebrewers Association's annual conference in Boulder, Colorado in June 1982, featuring 24 participating breweries and 47 beers.

In a private event held the week prior, judges evaluate the beers in the associated competition, and award medals in over 100 beer style categories. In 2019, the panel consisted of 322 judges from 18 countries, who evaluated over 9,400 beers.

The most recent GABF was held in 2019, featuring 800 breweries and 4,000 beers. The in-person festival was cancelled in 2020 and 2021, with a virtual event held instead, due to the COVID-19 pandemic. It is scheduled to return in 2022.

Statistics 
For a list of all medalists, see the List of Great American Beer Festival medalists

2004 
 Attendance - 28,000
 Breweries at the festival - 334
 Beers at the festival - 1,454
 Breweries in the competition - 398
 Beers in the competition - 2,016
 Medals awarded - 201

2005 
 Attendance - 29,500
 Breweries at the festival - 377
 Beers at the festival - 1,672
 Breweries in the competition - 466
 Beers in the competition - 2,335
 Category with most entries - American-style India Pale Ale: 103
 Medals awarded - 206

2006 
 Attendance - 41,000
 Breweries at the festival - 384
 Beers at the festival - 1,668
 Breweries in the competition - 450
 Beers in the competition - 2,402
 Category with most entries - American-style India Pale Ale: 94
 Medals awarded - 203

2007 
 Attendance - 46,000
 Breweries at the festival - 408
 Beers at the festival - 1,884
 Breweries in the competition - 473
 Beers in the competition - 2,973
 Category with most entries - American-style India Pale Ale: 120
 Medals awarded - 222 + 3 in Pro-Am

2008 
 Attendance - 46,000
 Breweries at the festival - 432
 Beers at the festival - 2,052
 Breweries in the competition - 472
 Beers in the competition - 2,902
 Category with most entries - American-style India Pale Ale: 106
 Medals awarded - 222 + 3 in Pro-Am

2009 
 Attendance - 49,576
 Breweries at the festival - 457
 Beers at the festival - 2,100
 Breweries in the competition - 495
 Beers in the competition - 3,308
 Category with the most entries - American-style India Pale Ale, 134 entries
 Medals awarded - 234 + 3 in Pro-Am

2010 
 Attendance - 49,000
 Breweries at the festival - 455
 Beers at the festival - 2,248
 Beers in the competition - 3,523
 Category with the most entries - American-style India Pale Ale, 150 entries
 Medals awarded - 236 + 3 in Pro-Am

2011 
 Attendance - 49,000
 Breweries at the festival - 466
 Beers at the festival - 2,375
 Beers in the competition - 3,930
 Category with the most entries - American-style India Pale Ale, 176 entries
 Medals awarded - 248 + 3 in Pro-Am

2017 
 Attendance - 60,000+
 Breweries at the festival - 2,217 (from all 50 states + D.C.)
 Beers at the festival - 3,900
 Beers in the competition - 7,923 entries

2019 
 Attendance - 60,000+
 Breweries at the festival - 2,300 (from all 50 states + D.C.)
 Beers at the festival - 4,000+
 Beers in the competition - 9,300 entries
 Beer style categories in the competition - 107

See also 
Craft beer

References

External links 

Festivals in Denver
Tourist attractions in Denver
Beer festivals in the United States
Beer awards
Autumn festivals
Festivals established in 1982
Beer in Colorado
1982 establishments in Colorado